Raised on Radio is the ninth studio album by the American rock band Journey, released in April 1986 on the Columbia Records label. It is the first album to not feature founding bassist Ross Valory, who is replaced by session bassists Randy Jackson and Bob Glaub. Drummer Steve Smith contributed to a few tracks, but was subsequently replaced by Larrie Londin and Mike Baird.

The album spawned three top 20 singles in the US: "Girl Can't Help It" (No. 17), "I'll Be Alright Without You" (No. 14), and "Suzanne" (No. 17). It also spawned a top ten single "Be Good to Yourself" (No. 9) It went to No. 4 on the Billboard 200 chart, and it was certified double platinum in the USA.

Background
Raised on Radio was released three years after Frontiers (1983). In 1984, both lead guitarist Neal Schon and lead singer Steve Perry released albums on their own; Schon in the band HSAS (Through the Fire), and Perry with his debut solo album, Street Talk. Perry considered leaving Journey following the release of Street Talk which he has referred to as "one of the most fun experiences I've had". Perry decided to return to working with Journey when he received a call from keyboardist Jonathan Cain, who wanted him to work on some unfinished songs.

Following Perry's return to Journey, he began to take more control over the band's direction. Bassist Ross Valory and drummer Steve Smith were fired from the band, against the wishes of manager Herbie Herbert. According to Perry, Valory and Smith "weren't pleased with the kind of music we were playing and weren't too keen on touring". Smith later said of the initial recording process: "There was a lot of pressure to do it the way Steve Perry wanted, which I had a lot of problems with because I felt it should be a group record, like all the other records." Valory and Smith were replaced by various studio musicians for the recording of Raised on Radio, including Randy Jackson (bass guitar) and Larrie Londin (drums). In the VH-1 Behind the Music episode featuring the band, Perry expressed regret over his decision, stating he'd have done things differently. Smith did record three tracks with Journey on the album, and he and Valory still received revenues from the record and subsequent tour. Both returned to Journey in 1995.

The band decided that Perry, who had proved his production capabilities on Street Talk, was the best fit to produce the album. According to Perry, this gave the rest of the band members as much creative control as possible: "Journey knows what it should sound like, so we all agreed I would be a good, safe, nondictator-type producer."

Perry changed the original title of this project from Freedom to Raised on Radio, which drew the ire of Herbert and some of the band members, as it varied from the one-word general theme in most of their previous albums. The band would end up using the Freedom title 36 years later for their fifteenth studio album.

Studio drummer Mike Baird and bassist/backing vocalist Randy Jackson played in place of Smith and Valory on the subsequent tour.

Artwork
The cover of the album (by Prairie Prince, an early member of the band) was modeled after the studios and antennas for KNGS in Hanford, California, which was owned by Perry's parents, Ray and Mary Perry.

Songs
Cash Box said of "Suzanne" that "Somewhat brooding verses give way to explosive choruses which feature Steve Perry’s potent singing" and that "Journey has captured the essence of teen romance." Billboard said of it that Journey's "power rock style gets adapted just a bit here toward the techno-dance idiom."

Cash Box said of "Why Can't This Night Go On Forever" that it's a "rousing, emotional ballad is pure Journey" with a "bracing, high-wire vocal" from Steve Perry.

Track listing

Personnel 
Credits for Raised on Radio adapted from liner notes.

Journey
 Steve Perry – lead vocals
 Jonathan Cain – keyboards, backing vocals
 Neal Schon – guitars, guitar synthesizer, backing vocals, keyboards (10)
 Steve Smith – drums (2, 10, 11)

Additional musicians
 Randy Jackson – bass (1, 3–9), backing vocals (1, 3–9) 12 and 13
 Bob Glaub – bass (2, 10, 11)
 Larrie Londin – drums (1, 3–9)
 Mike Baird – drums (12, 13) (2006 CD reissue only)
 Steve Minkins – percussion (3)
 Danny Hull (credited as Dan Hull) – saxophone (2, 7), harp (7)

Production
 Steve Perry – producer 
 Jonathan Cain – additional vocal co-production
 Randy Goodrum – additional vocal co-production
 Jim Gaines – associate producer, engineer
 Mark McKenna – engineer
 Steve Rinkoff – engineer
 Robert Missbach – assistant engineer
 Bob Clearmountain – mixing at Bearsville Studios and The Power Station (New York, NY)
 Bob Ludwig – mastering at Masterdisk (New York, NY), remastering
 Brian Lee – remastering

Charts 
 

Album

Singles

Certifications

References

Journey (band) albums
1986 albums
Columbia Records albums
Albums produced by Jonathan Cain
Songs about radio